Roberts House is located in Barneveld, Wisconsin. It was listed on the National Register of Historic Places in 1988 and on the State Register of Historic Places the following year.

References

Houses on the National Register of Historic Places in Wisconsin
National Register of Historic Places in Iowa County, Wisconsin
Houses in Iowa County, Wisconsin
Bungalow architecture in Wisconsin
Houses completed in 1920